Boquet is an unincorporated community in Penn Township, Westmoreland County, Pennsylvania, United States.

Etymology

Though his name was spelled somewhat differently, it is commonly accepted that Boquet was named after General Henry Bouquet, a British army officer of the 18th century.  The community lies along the original route of the Forbes Road, the road created by a British/colonial force under British General John Forbes to displace the French from Fort Duquesne in 1758. It was the second road into  western Pennsylvania, the first having been Braddock's Road in 1755.  Within a few years of its creation, the segment of Forbes Road that Boquet would come to be located upon was removed several miles to the south.  The newer, more southerly variant diverged from the original near present SR 66, east of Boquet, and rejoined the original road several miles west of Boquet.  The Battle of Bushy Run, part of Pontiac's War, took place at a site on the newer, more southerly route of Forbes' Road.

Although General John Forbes was the commander of the military expedition that created the road, Colonel Henri Boquet had become the de facto commander, as General Forbes was very ill.  Also named after Henri Boquet are Boquet Street in the Oakland section of Pittsburgh, and a blockhouse at the site of Fort Pitt, named Boquet's Redoubt.  This blockhouse, built in 1764, is commonly considered to be the oldest structure in western Pennsylvania.

Landmarks 
Possibly the most significant landmark in the Boquet area is the Greensburg-Jeannette Regional airport.
Just over a mile's distance from the community lies the site of the Battle of Bushy Run, an important part of the Pontiac’s War. Re-enactments of the battle are held during the summer.

Other prominent places in and around Boquet include three golf courses: Cloverleaf Golf Club, Westmoreland Country Club, and Manor Valley Country Club. In addition, Boquet is home to numerous historical buildings from the 19th century, including a former whiskey bonding house, built of cut stone in 1818, that has since been remodeled into a home.

Unincorporated communities in Westmoreland County, Pennsylvania
Unincorporated communities in Pennsylvania
1764 establishments in Pennsylvania